Henri Laudier (20 February 1878 – 10 October 1943) was a French journalist and politician.

He was born at Vierzon, Cher department, France. In his early years he was a tailor and a town clerk before becoming a journalist. Laudier was the editor of Tocsin, a socialist weekly publication. He served the General Counsel of Bourges before becoming the mayor of Bourges from 1919 to 1943. He was a member of the French Section of the Workers' International (Section Française de l'Internationale Ouvrière) from 1919 to 1924. His book, Ce qu'est le parti socialiste was published in 1919 by SFIO's Librairie du parti socialiste. Laudier was a member of the Chamber of Deputies (1919-1924).
He was a Senator of the French Third Republic representing Cher elected in 1930 and reelected 1939, with his term ending upon his death in 1943. He died in Bourges, Cher, France.

References

1878 births
1943 deaths
People from Vierzon
Politicians from Centre-Val de Loire
French Section of the Workers' International politicians
Members of the 12th Chamber of Deputies of the French Third Republic
French Senators of the Third Republic
Senators of Cher (department)
French editors
French male non-fiction writers